A Bright Shining Lie is a 1998 American war drama television film written and directed by Terry George, based on Neil Sheehan's 1988 book of the same name and the true story of John Paul Vann's experience in the Vietnam War. It stars Bill Paxton, Amy Madigan, Vivian Wu, Donal Logue, Eric Bogosian and Kurtwood Smith. It aired on HBO on May 30, 1998.

Cast
 Bill Paxton as John Paul Vann
 Karina Logue as Barmaid
 Amy Madigan as Mary Jane Vann
 Donal Logue as Steven Burnett
 Harve Presnell as General Paul Harkins
 Robert John Burke as Frank Drummond
 Bill Whelan as Ron Dray
 Lim Kay Tong as Colonel Cao Huynh Van
 Seng Kawee as VC Leader
 Vivian Wu as Lee
 Van Thoa Trinh as VC Commander
 Richard Libertini as Marriage Counselor
 James Bigwood as Office Manager
 Ed Lauter as General Weyand
 Kurtwood Smith as General Westmoreland
 Eric Bogosian as Doug Elders, a composite character not in the book melding elements of real-life people in the book, Daniel Ellsberg and Douglas Ramsey, who both worked with Vann; Ellsberg and reporter David Halberstam had asked that their names be removed from the production after reading an early draft of the screenplay 
 James Rebhorn as Ambassador Bunker
 Les J.N. Mau as Colonel Dinh
 David Warshofsky as Terry Pike
 Thanh Nguyen as ARVN Translator
 Pichariva Narakbunchai as Annie
 Kris von Habsburg as a US soldier
 Matthew Ascherl, Simon Gaut and Jamie Watts (American GI's), featured in opening scene(s) at airfield

Award nominations
In 1998, the film was nominated for a Primetime Emmy Award for Outstanding Made for Television Movie. In 1999, Bill Paxton was nominated for a Golden Globe Award for his performance in the film.

References

External links
 

1998 television films
1998 films
1998 drama films
1990s American films
1990s English-language films
1990s war drama films
American drama television films
American films based on actual events
American war drama films
Drama films based on actual events
Films about the United States Army
Films based on non-fiction books
Films directed by Terry George
Films scored by Gary Chang
Films shot in Thailand
HBO Films films
Vietnam War films
Television films based on actual events
Television films based on books
War films based on actual events
War television films